Thagamthirtthapurisvarar Temple is a Siva temple in Eraiyur in Cuddalore district in Tamil Nadu (India).

Vaippu Sthalam
It is one of the shrines of the Vaippu Sthalams sung by Tamil Saivite Nayanar Sambandar.

Presiding deity
The presiding deity is known as Thagamthirtthapurisvarar. The Goddess is known as Annapurani.

Speciality
This place was called as Maranpadi. Now it is known as Eraiyur or Iraiyur. The presiding deity and Sambandar are found in separate shrines.

References

Hindu temples in Cuddalore district
Shiva temples in Cuddalore district